Hot Wheels: Velocity X (also known as Hot Wheels Velocity X: Maximum Justice in the PlayStation 2 version) is a vehicular combat video game released in 2002 by Beyond Games. There are versions for the GameCube, PlayStation 2, PC, and Game Boy Advance. The game is based on the Hot Wheels toy automobiles.

Plot
The story begins when The Hot Wheels car business, owned by Dr. Peter Justice, is robbed and bombed; the most vital items that were stolen being some computer disks on the formula Velocity X (a formula for a racing super fuel that allows cars to travel twice their normal speed) and a prototype Hot Wheels car (that runs on uranium and can turn invisible for short periods of time). Peter's 17 year old son, Maxwell "Max" Justice (voiced by David Kaufman), insists on his dad's robot "Gearhead" that he should try to track down whoever stole the cars and attempt to retrieve them all (in the GBA version, however, the robot, "Gearhead" is the playable character). He is confronted with various "villains" on his quest, such as Conrad "Nitro" Byrne, Billy Bob "Backroads" Belcher, Fast Lane Friscatti, Simon "Slick" Deluca and Rupert Jacoby, all of whom work for the main antagonist of the game, Otto Von Diesel (Dr. Peter Justice's former associate on the Hot Wheels engineering team), who is trying to get both the prototype car and Velocity X so he can go back in time and destroy the Justice family and thereby prevent any and all Hot Wheels cars from ever existing.

Gameplay
In the main Adventure mode, the player has to beat all 14 missions, while completing tasks in each one. These tasks vary from destroying a few vehicles, collecting items, racing/battling a boss, and more. The game's missions take place across 5 different locations, with three missions in each world, except for the final world, which only has 2 missions.

In the GBA version, the story mode is simply races mixed with tasks given by the Professor such as destroying other vehicles and collecting items. At the end of each, a boss is raced.

In the Challenge mode, the player has to complete all 18 challenges. Each challenge comes with various tasks, such as achieving "x" Stunt points, collecting "x" gears, or reaching the finish before the clock hits 00:00. Along the way, new vehicles, as well as new race/battle maps and weapons, are unlocked. In the GBA version the Challenges are Battle, where the player destroys opponents; and Tag, where the player rams opponents.

The game also has a Drag Race mode, a Battle mode, and a Joyride mode. The Drag Race and Battle modes are both single-player and multiplayer (except in the PC version of the game). The Joyride, in essence, is free roam. The player can also unlock cars in Joyride by collecting all ten gears or finding the hidden key in each map. These modes are absent in the GBA version.

The player begins with six vehicles, and three in the GBA version. The game has 27 additional vehicles that can be unlocked by successfully completing various challenges and missions.  Each car is rated on its speed, grip, stunt, and armor.

Reception

Hot Wheels: Velocity X received "mixed" reviews on all platforms according to video game review aggregator Metacritic.

References

2002 video games
Beyond Games games
GameCube games
PlayStation 2 games
Windows games
Game Boy Advance games
Games with GameCube-GBA connectivity
Racing video games
THQ games
Hot Wheels video games
Video games based on toys
Video games developed in the United States
Multiplayer and single-player video games